Lord or Lady of Balaguer is a title historically held by the person first in line to the Kingdom of Majorca, a part of the Crown of Aragon. The current holder is Princess Leonor, elder daughter and heir presumptive of Felipe VI.

Evolution
This Lordship was created in 1418 by King Alfonso V of Aragon, called the Magnanimous, for his brother John II, symbolically linked to the city that had been capital of the suppressed County of Urgell, the feudal command of the greater rival of the House of Trastámara for the possession of the Aragonese Crown during the Interregnum, James II, Count of Urgell. 

When John II succeeded Alfonso V in 1458, the title was awarded to John's second son, Ferdinand. After Ferdinand II's accession, the lordship was held by the heir apparent to the Crown of Aragon and was always joined to the title of Prince of Girona.

Notes

See also
 Balaguer
 Crown of Aragon
 Coat of arms of the Prince of Asturias
 Line of succession to the Spanish Throne
 List of titles and honours of the Heir Apparent to the Spanish Throne

External links
 Official website of the Spanish Monarchy

Crown of Aragon
History of Catalonia
History of the Balearic Islands
Spanish royalty
1418 establishments in Europe
15th-century establishments in Aragon
1410s establishments in Europe